Li Peng or Peng Li is the name of:

Li Peng (1928-2019), Chinese politician
Peng Li (professor), Chinese-born researcher at Texas A&M University, USA
Li Peng (table tennis) (born 1955), Chinese table tennis player
Li Peng (footballer) (born 1990), Chinese association footballer
Li Peng (physiologist) (born 1965), Chinese physiologist